Gerald Bruns (born April 10, 1938) is an American literary scholar and philosopher and William P. & Hazel B. White Professor Emeritus of English at the University of Notre Dame.

Books
 Modern Poetry and the Idea of Language, Yale University Press, 1974
 Inventions: Writing, Textuality, and Understanding in Literary History, Yale, 1982
 Hermeneutics Ancient and Modern, Yale, 1992
 Tragic Thoughts at the End of Philosophy: Language, Literature, and Ethical Theory, Northwestern University Press, 1999
 What Are Poets For? An Anthropology of Contemporary Poetry and Poetics, University of Iowa Press, 2012
 On Ceasing to be Human, Stanford University Press, 2010
 On the Anarchy of Poetry and Philosophy, Fordham University Press, 2006
 The Material of Poetry: Sketches for a Philosophical Poetics, University of Georgia Press, 2005
 Interruptions: The Fragmentary Aesthetic in Modern Literature, University of Alabama Press, 2018

References

21st-century American philosophers
Philosophy academics
Living people
Continental philosophers
University of Notre Dame faculty
Heidegger scholars
American literary critics
1938 births